Sebastião Pereira dos Santos (born 11 May 1936), better known as Tião, is a Brazilian footballer. He played in three matches for the Brazil national football team in 1959. He was also part of Brazil's squad for the 1959 South American Championship that took place in Ecuador.

References

External links
 

1936 births
Living people
Brazilian footballers
Brazil international footballers
Place of birth missing (living people)
Association footballers not categorized by position